DFL primarily refers to the Minnesota Democratic–Farmer–Labor Party, an affiliate of the U.S. Democratic Party. It may also refer to:

 Cosworth DFL, a variant of the Cosworth DFV Formula One engine, intended for Group C racing
 David Florida Laboratory, a Canadian aerospace laboratory
 Degree of financial leverage, a metric of leverage (finance)
 Dead Fucking Last, a US punk band
 Democrats for Life, an organization of anti-abortion Democrats
 Design for logistics, a supply-chain management concept
 Deutsche Fußball Liga, operator of the German Fußball-Bundesliga
 Dongfeng Motor Co., Ltd., a joint-venture between Dongfeng and Nissan
 Dunfermline Queen Margaret railway station, National Rail station code DFL, in Scotland
 Down From London, describing a person who has moved to the country from London, England